Víctor Celestino Algarañaz (born 6 April 1926, date of death unknown) was a Bolivian football forward who played for Bolivia in the 1950 FIFA World Cup. He also played for Club Litoral. Algarañaz is deceased.

References

External links

FIFA profile 

1926 births
Year of death missing
Bolivian footballers
Bolivia international footballers
Association football forwards
Club Deportivo Litoral (Cochabamba) players
1949 South American Championship players
1950 FIFA World Cup players